Nimboran (Nambrong) is a Papuan language of Nimboran District, Jayapura Regency, Indonesia spoken by mostly older adults. Younger generations have shifted to Papuan Malay. It is spoken in about 26 villages to the west of Lake Sentani.

Phonology
{| class="wikitable" style="text-align:center;"
|+ Consonants:
! colspan="2" |
! Labial
! Alveolar
! Velar
|-
! rowspan="3" | Plosive
! 
| 
| 
| 
|-
! 
| 
| 
| 
|-
! 
| 
| 
| 
|-
! colspan="2" | Nasal
| 
| 
| 
|-
! colspan="2" | Fricative
|
| 
|
|-
! colspan="2" | Liquid
|
| 
|
|-
! colspan="2" | Semivowel
| 
| 
|
|}

{| class="wikitable" style="text-align:center;"
|+ Vowels:
! || Front || Central || Back
|-
! Close
|  ||  || 
|-
! Mid
|  ||  || 
|-
! Open
|  ||  || 
|}

References

Nimboran languages
Languages of western New Guinea